The 1935 Giro d'Italia was the 23rd edition of the Giro d'Italia, organized and sponsored by the newspaper La Gazzetta dello Sport. The race was won by the Italian rider Vasco Bergamaschi of the Maino team, with fellow Italians Giuseppe Martano and Giuseppe Olmo coming in second and third respectively.

This Giro saw the last participation of Alfredo Binda and the first of Gino Bartali, then 20 years old, who won the mountains classification.

Participants

Of the 101 riders that began the Giro d'Italia on 18 May, 62 of them made it to the finish in Milan on 9 June. Riders were allowed to ride on their own or as a member of a team; 55 riders competed as part of a team, while the remaining 46 competed independently. There were eight teams that competed in the race: Bianchi, Dei, Fréjus, Gloria, Helyett, Legnano, and Maino.

The peloton was primarily composed of Italians. The field featured seven former Giro d'Italia champions in five-time winner Alfredo Binda, two-time champion Costante Girardengo, and single race winners, Francesco Camusso, Luigi Marchisio, Antonio Pesenti, Learco Guerra, and Vasco Bergamaschi. Other notable Italian riders that started the race included Giuseppe Olmo, Raffaele Di Paco, Remo Bertoni, and Domenico Piemontesi. French cyclist and two-time Tour de France champion André Leducq entered the Giro d'Italia for the first time in his career. Other notable non-Italian riders included: Maurice Archambaud, Jef Demuysere, and René Vietto.

Route and stages

Classification leadership

The leader of the general classification – calculated by adding the stage finish times of each rider – wore a pink jersey. This classification is the most important of the race, and its winner is considered as the winner of the Giro.

The highest ranked non-Italian cyclist in the general classification and the highest ranked isolati cyclist in the general classification were tracked.

In the mountains classification, the race organizers selected different mountains that the route crossed and awarded points to the riders who crossed them first.

The winner of the team classification was determined by adding the finish times of the best three cyclists per team together and the team with the lowest total time was the winner. If a team had fewer than three riders finish, they were not eligible for the classification.

The rows in the following table correspond to the jerseys awarded after that stage was run.

Final standings

General classification

Foreign rider classification

Isolati rider classification

Mountains classification

Team classification

References

Notes

Citations

G
Giro d'Italia
Giro d'Italia by year
Giro d'Italia
Giro d'Italia